Crocus (M917) is a  minehunter of the Belgian Naval Component, launched on 3 September 1986 at the Mercantile-Belyard shipyard in Rupelmonde and completed on 5 February 1987. The patronage of Crocus was accepted by the city of Genk. It was the third of the Belgian Tripartite-class minehunters.

References

External links

Tripartite-class minehunters of the Belgian Navy
Ships built in Belgium
Ships built in France
Ships built in the Netherlands
1986 ships
Minehunters of Belgium